Myron Joseph Pottios (born January 18, 1939) is a former American football linebacker in the National Football League (NFL) for the Washington Redskins, Los Angeles Rams, and the Pittsburgh Steelers. He was elected to play in 3 Pro Bowls.

College
Pottios played college football at the University of Notre Dame and was drafted in the second round of the 1961 NFL Draft by the Pittsburgh Steelers, also in the third round of the 1961 AFL Draft by the Oakland Raiders. He chose to play in Pittsburgh.

NFL

Pittsburgh Steelers
Pottios became the starting middle linebacker of the Pittsburgh Steelers from his rookie year, 1961, up to 1965. In his rookie year, he played in all 14 games, intercepting 2 passes and recovering 1 fumble for a defense that was 7th among 14 NFL teams in points allowed. He did not play in 1962. In 1963, he played in all 14 games, intercepting 4 passes for a defense that finished 8th among 14 NFL teams in points allowed, playing alongside rookie outside linebacker Andy Russell. In 1964, he played in only 7 of 14 games, intercepting 1 pass and recovering 1 fumble for a defense that finished 9th among 14 NFL teams in points allowed. In 1965, he played in only 6 games, intercepting no pass and with no fumble recovery for a defense that finished 12th among 14 NFL teams in points allowed and a team that ended the season at 2-12.

Los Angeles Rams
In contrast, when Pottios joined the Rams from 1966 to 1970, with George Allen as head coach, they were above the .500 mark throughout the period and made the playoffs twice, in 1967 and 1969, with won-lost records of 11-1-2 and 11-3, respectively. Pottios was the starting middle linebacker from 1967 to 1970, playing between outside linebackers Jack Pardee and Maxie Baughan throughout. In 1966, Pottios played in 12 games, but was the backup middle linebacker to the 37-year-old Bill George who played in all 14 games. In 1967, he played 11 of 14 games, intercepting 1 pass and recovering 1 fumble for the best defense in the league among 16 NFL teams in points allowed. That team lost to the Green Bay Packers in the divisional round, in which Pottios started at middle linebacker. In 1968, he played all 14 games, recovering 4 fumbles for a defense that finished 3rd among 16 NFL teams in points allowed. But, in 1969, he played in only 5 of 14 games, replaced by Doug Woodlief. That team lost to the Minnesota Vikings in the divisional round with Woodlief as the starter. In 1970, his final year with the Rams, he regained his starting middle linebacker position, playing in all 14 games, with 2 interceptions and 2 fumbles recovered for a defense that finished 4th among 26 NFL teams in points allowed.

Washington Redskins
Pottios, along with Jack Pardee, Maxie Baughan, Diron Talbert, John Wilbur and Jeff Jordan, followed head coach George Allen to the Redskins which also acquired a 1971 fifth-round pick (124th overall–traded to Green Bay Packers for Boyd Dowler) from the Rams for Marlin McKeever, first and third rounders in 1971 (10th and 63rd overall–Isiah Robertson and Dave Elmendorf respectively) and third, fourth, fifth, sixth and seventh rounders in 1972 (73rd, 99th, 125th, 151st and 177th overall–to New England Patriots, traded to Philadelphia Eagles for Joe Carollo, Bob Christiansen, Texas Southern defensive tackle Eddie Herbert and to New York Giants respectively) on January 28, 1971.

Playing up to 1973, his team reached the playoffs all three years, inserted between outside linebackers Pardee (1971–72) or Dave Robinson (1973) and Chris Hanburger (1971–73). In 1971, Pottios played in all 14 games and had one interception for a defense that finished 4th of 26 teams in the NFL in points allowed. That team lost a divisional round game to the San Francisco 49ers in which Pottios started. In 1972, he played in only 7 games of 14 games, replaced by Harold McLinton, and recovered 1 fumble for a defense that finished 3rd of 26 teams in the NFL in points allowed. However, Pottios was the starting middle linebacker in all 3 playoff games the Redskins played that year, when they won a divisional round game against the Green Bay Packers and the NFC championship game against the Dallas Cowboys, in which the Roger Staubach-led Cowboys were limited to a miserable 169 yards of total offense and 3 points. However, Washington lost Super Bowl VII to the Miami Dolphins 14–7, in which they could not handle the running attack led by Larry Csonka. In 1973, his final year in the NFL, he played in only 6 of 14 games, but started a divisional round match against the Minnesota Vikings, losing his final game.

References

External links
 https://www.pro-football-reference.com/players/P/PottMy00.htm

1939 births
Living people
American football linebackers
Players of American football from Pennsylvania
Pittsburgh Steelers players
Los Angeles Rams players
Washington Redskins players
Eastern Conference Pro Bowl players
Notre Dame Fighting Irish football players